Tian Wenlie (November 9, 1858 – November 12, 1924) was a Chinese politician of the late Qing Dynasty and early Republican period, military governor of Henan province and supporter of Yuan Shikai's restoration of the monarchy. He was born in Hanyang, Hubei (now Hanyang District, Wuhan) and died in Beijing.

Awards and decorations
Order of Rank and MeritOrder of the Golden Grain

1858 births
1924 deaths
Qing dynasty politicians from Hubei
Chinese police officers
Republic of China politicians from Hubei
Politicians from Wuhan
Empire of China (1915–1916)